The most popular Latin pop songs in 2004, ranked by radio airplay audience impressions and measured by Nielsen BDS.

References

United States Latin Pop Airplay
2004
2004 in Latin music